Emilio Ratia (born 10 March 1968) is a Spanish diver. He competed in the men's 10 metre platform event at the 1988 Summer Olympics.

References

1968 births
Living people
Spanish male divers
Olympic divers of Spain
Divers at the 1988 Summer Olympics
Place of birth missing (living people)